Joy Kiluvigyuak Hallauk (1940–2000) was an Inuit artist.

Her work is included in the collections of the Musée national des beaux-arts du Québec and the Winnipeg Art Gallery.

References

1940 births
2000 deaths
20th-century Canadian women artists
21st-century Canadian women artists